Czepiec may refer to:

 Czepiec, West Pomeranian Voivodeship, village in the administrative district of Gmina Wałcz, Wałcz County
 Czepiec, Świętokrzyskie Voivodeship, village in the administrative district of Gmina Sędziszów, Jędrzejów County